The men's singles tennis event of the 2019 Pan American Games was held July 29 – August 4 at the Club Lawn Tennis de la Exposición in Lima, Peru.

João Menezes of Brazil won the gold medal, defeating Tomás Barrios of Chile in the final, 7–5, 3–6, 6–4.

Guido Andreozzi of Argentina won the bronze medal, defeating Facundo Bagnis of Argentina in the bronze-medal match, 6–4, 7–5.

Seeds

Draw

Finals

Top half

Section 1

Section 2

Bottom half

Section 3

Section 4

References
 Draw

Men's Singles